Velaphi Ndlangamandla (born 1966), known as The Saloon Killer, is a South African robber and serial killer, responsible for killing 19 people between April and September 1998 in Mpumalanga. He was sentenced to 137 years' imprisonment for his crimes.

On April 4, 1997, after stealing a .22 Anschütz rifle from Jacobus Christoffel van Schalkwyk, colloquially called a "saloon", Ndlangamandla also stole another shotgun, ammunition, radios, jewelry, clothing, cash and some food, before going on a further crime spree. A police task team, headed by Police Superintendent Koos fourie, arrested Ndlangamandla at the Phoswa village near Piet Retief on September 10, 1998. He was charged with 19 counts of murder charges, 9 of attempted murder, 6 of robbery, one of attempted robbery, 5 of housebreaking, indecent assault, illegal possession of a firearm and ammunition, and pointing a firearm. Ndlangamandla was convicted of all charges, and sentenced to 137 years' imprisonment. Superentendent Faan Steenkamp, praised the policemen's work, and warned all other criminals that they would not get away for long.

See also
List of serial killers by country
List of serial killers by number of victims

References

Bibliography
 
 

1966 births
Living people
Male serial killers
People convicted of indecent assault
People convicted of murder by South Africa
Robbers
South African serial killers
People convicted of illegal possession of weapons